La Haye-de-Routot is a commune in the Eure department in north-western France. It is located on the border of Seine-Maritime, south of the Forêt de Brotonne.

Population

Sights

Shoe museum
The tiny Chapelle de Sainte-Anne which is carved into a yew tree

See also
Communes of the Eure department

References

Communes of Eure